Gajapathi Garvabhanga is a 1989 Indian comedy film in the Kannada language. It was directed by M. S. Rajashekar and produced by the actor Rajkumar's production company Poornima Enterprises. The movie stars his second son Raghavendra Rajkumar and Malashri. The cast included  Dheerendra Gopal, Srinath and Honnavalli Krishna.  The film ran in theatres for 365 days. Raghavendra Rajkumar's previous movie Nanjundi Kalyana was also a comedy with involving many of the same cast and crew.

Cast
 Raghavendra Rajkumar as Kishore 
 Malashri as Sowmya
 K. S. Ashwath as Ranganna Meshtru
 Srinath as Ananthu Meshtru
 Dheerendra Gopal as Gajapathi
 Sangeeta
 Honnavalli Krishna as "Kudure" Krishna
 Mysore Lokesh
 Mandeep Roy
 Doddanna 
Dombara Krishna Suresh 
Killer Venkatesh 
Neegro Johnny 
 Shivaram 
 Abhinaya as Shobha
 M. S. Umesh as Thippayya
 Tennis Krishna

Soundtrack

References

https://archive.today/20130218014038/http://popcorn.oneindia.in/movie-cast/7876/gajapathi-garvabhanga.html
http://www.raaga.com/channels/kannada/music/Upendra_Kumar.html

External links 

1980s Kannada-language films
1989 films
Films directed by M. S. Rajashekar
Films scored by Upendra Kumar
Indian comedy films
1989 comedy films